Janet Davis is a former city councillor in Toronto, Ontario, Canada. She represented Ward 31 Beaches-East York (now Ward 19), the northern portion of Beaches—East York, from 2003 to 2018. She is well known for her work on affordable day care and preserving public pools in the city.

Before her election to Council she served as president of the Ontario Coalition for Better Child Care, she also spent fifteen years developing child care at the Toronto District School Board and also served as senior policy advisor to the Minister of Education.

On June 13, 2018, Davis announced that she was not running for another term in the October 2018 municipal election after 15 years in office.

Election results

References

External links

Living people
Women municipal councillors in Canada
Toronto city councillors
Women in Ontario politics
Year of birth missing (living people)